David Dye is an American radio broadcaster, best known as the host of WXPN-FM's nationally syndicated music show World Cafe from 1991 to 2017.

Dye began his broadcasting career as a host on WMMR-FM. He then worked for stations in Maine before returning to the Philadelphia market with WHYY-FM and WIOQ. He joined WXPN in 1989, creating World Cafe and overseeing the show's expansion into a nationally syndicated program airing on over 200 National Public Radio stations.

Dye announced his retirement as host of World Cafe in 2016. He continues to host a weekly program on WXPN called "Dave's World" which airs Sundays.

References

American radio DJs
NPR personalities
Radio personalities from Philadelphia
Living people
Year of birth missing (living people)